The People's Party of Canada (PPC) is a right-wing populist federal political party in Canada. The party was formed by Maxime Bernier in September 2018, shortly after his resignation from the Conservative Party of Canada. It is placed on the right-wing to far right of the left–right political spectrum.

Bernier, a former candidate for the 2017 Conservative Party of Canada leadership election and cabinet minister, was the party's only Member of Parliament (MP) from its founding in 2018 to his defeat in the 2019 Canadian federal election. The PPC formed electoral district associations (EDAs) in 326 ridings, and ran candidates in 315 ridings, of Canada's total 338 ridings, in the 2019 federal election; however, no candidate was elected under its banner and Bernier lost his bid for personal re-election in Beauce. The party ran 312 candidates in the 2021 Canadian federal election; none were elected to parliament, despite it increasing its share of the popular vote to nearly five per cent.

The party advocates for reduced immigration to Canada at 150,000 per year, scrapping the Canadian Multiculturalism Act, withdrawing from the Paris Agreement, ending corporate welfare, and ending supply management. In the 2021 federal election, the PPC also ran in opposition to COVID-19 lockdowns and restrictions, vaccine passports, and compulsory vaccinations. Described as a populist party in the mould of radical-right European parties but with right-leaning economic libertarian, or economic liberal in European context, policies, it has also been variously labelled as classical liberal, conservative, and right-wing populist.

History

Formation 

The PPC was formed a few weeks after the resignation of Maxime Bernier, a candidate in the 2017 Conservative Party of Canada leadership election and former cabinet minister from the Conservative Party of Canada. In his resignation speech, Bernier stated that he was leaving because "I've come to realize... this party is too intellectually and morally corrupt to be reformed." Bernier also stated that under opposition leader Andrew Scheer, to whom Bernier finished runner-up in the 2017 party leadership election, the Conservative Party had abandoned its principles on issues including political correctness, corporate welfare, equalization payments reform, and supply management. In a National Post op-ed, Bernier stated that his motive for forming the party was to reverse the public choice dynamic in the Canadian political system resulting in vote-buying and pandering by political parties. He reiterated his belief that the Conservative Party could not be reformed to end this practice, and that a new political party was required.

Bernier was accused by prominent Conservative politicians such as former prime ministers Stephen Harper and Brian Mulroney of trying to divide the political right. He responded on the CBC Television show Power & Politics that he wanted to focus on disaffected voters, and cited the political rise of French president Emmanuel Macron as an example. Bernier later cited the breakthrough of the People's Alliance of New Brunswick in the 2018 New Brunswick general election and the Coalition Avenir Québec win in 2018 Quebec general election as examples of voters' disdain for traditional political parties and expressing a desire for change by voting for new parties.

Prior to his resignation from the Conservative Party, Bernier had begun reestablishing contact with individuals who had supported his 2017 Conservative leadership bid; they believed he had the necessary support to register a party with Elections Canada. Le Devoir reported that members of seven Conservative constituency associations defected to the party. A few days after announcing the party name, Libertarian Party of Canada leader Tim Moen, who had previously offered the leadership of that party to Bernier, stated that he was open to the idea of a merger with the People's Party. When asked by Global News, Bernier indicated he had no interest in a merger. When asked about organizing by the party, he mentioned that he would use tools that did not exist in the past, such as the use of social media.

Bernier planned to run candidates in all of Canada's 338 federal ridings in the 2019 Canadian federal election. The party's registration documents were officially submitted to Elections Canada on October 10, 2018. In addition, he stated that electoral district associations (EDA) would be in place by December 31, 2018, and that the EDAs would start focusing on finding candidates starting in January 2019. On November 1, 2018, the party revealed that it had over 30,000 "founding members". News outlets later revealed that one of the PPC's founding members was a former American white nationalist, and that two others had ties to anti-immigration groups. The former white nationalist was removed from the party on August 29, 2019, after his past came to light. A spokesperson for the party stated that his past didn't come up during the vetting process since he came from the United States. The two other members denied having racist views and the party later told Le Devoir that they did not have enough resources to vet them at the beginning of the PPC's formation.

In November 2018, Minister of Democratic Institutions Karina Gould said that Bernier would qualify for debates hosted by the Leaders' Debates Commission if the party nominated candidates in 90 per cent of ridings. The party held rallies in Vancouver, Calgary, Toronto, Ottawa–Gatineau, Winnipeg, Saskatoon, and Quebec City. In 2019, it held rallies in Hamilton, Saint John, and Halifax. On December 21, 2018, the party established EDAs in all 338 electoral districts.

Registration 
The party received its eligibility status on November 11, 2018. It was registered by Elections Canada on January 19, 2019, after nominating candidates for by-elections in Outremont, York—Simcoe, and Burnaby South which were called for February 25, 2019, and Nanaimo—Ladysmith. In the February 25 by-elections, the party received 10.9 per cent of the vote in Burnaby South and 1.5 per cent in each of York—Simcoe and Outremont.

Candidate selections for the 2019 federal election 
Bernier told the National Post that the party would start candidate nominations for the October general election after the by-elections. On March 25, 2019, Bernier announced in a press conference that the party has opened an online search for candidates until April 23, with candidate selection meetings to follow between May 7 and 13. In an interview on the CTV television show Power Play, he said that the party planned to have their first convention on June 1 to 2. The party held their conference from August 18 to 19, where "roughly 500 party officials took part in door knocking workshops, traditional media and social media training, debate training and mock debate."

The party has undergone several controversies. In April 2019, Angelo Isidorou, a party executive and the Vancouver Quadra district association president resigned, stating the party was an "utter free-for-all" and had been "hijacked by egomaniacs". Isidorou was one of the earliest individuals to blow the whistle on internal racism within the party. More resignations followed Isidorou and echoed accusations that the party had been infiltrated by "racist, xenophobic, homophobic and downright hateful people". In July 2019, the entire People's Party of Canada board in Elmwood—Transcona publicly sent a resignation letter, claiming that "racists", "anti-Semites" and "conspiracy theorists" had taken over and were promoting "the closure of Canada's "physical and economic borders" and had "spread misinformation through personal and official channels". They cited disillusionment towards the party's increasingly xenophobic nature and lack of focus towards economic discussion as their core reasons for resigning. Steven Fletcher, PPC candidate for Charleswood—St. James—Assiniboia—Headingley, rejected the accusation, claiming the action is rooted in vindictiveness against Bernier. The manager of the Elmwood—Transcona Facebook page responded to the criticism by stating: "Our problem is not necessarily with Max [Bernier] himself, but the entire organization has deep-rooted problems." The Winnipeg South Centre EDA argued that it was normal for a party to have "people with crazy ideas and racists" and wanted to know how the party reacted to it. Fletcher disputed their statement, stating that "they'd be kicked out pretty fast" if they held any such viewpoints, and touted the diversity of the PPC's candidates. Fletcher claimed that "some elements of the NDP and the Green Party" have "anti-Semitic viewpoints" and that there was an "anti-Quebec vibe" in online forums from "people supporting [Conservative Party leader] Andrew Scheer." The PPC later told Global News that the removal of the white nationalist was an example of the party taking a stand against racism.

In the 2019 Canadian federal election, Bernier lost his own seat to a Conservative, and no People's Party candidates were elected. Bernier was the only People's Party candidate to come even close to winning; he won 28.4 per cent of the vote (a 20-point drop from 2015), and no other candidate won more than four per cent of the vote. The party received approximately 1.6 per cent of the popular vote nationwide. According to the Canadian Press, the PPC may have cost the Conservatives some ridings but did not garner enough votes to affect the overall result.

After the 2019 federal election 
On February 24, 2020, Elections Canada deregistered 38 of the party's EDAs for failing to comply with reporting requirements. The deregistered EDAs would not be able to accept contributions or issue tax receipts unless they remedy their status with Elections Canada and become re-registered. Two candidates, including Maxime Bernier ran for the Toronto Centre and York Centre by-election, following the resignations of Michael Levitt and Bill Morneau; however, both candidates were unsuccessful in their campaign, garnering less than 3.6 per cent of the popular vote in each riding, and other EDAs have voluntarily deregistered.

2021 federal election 
The PPC announced it would contest the 2021 federal election with the same platform it used in 2019 and Bernier running in his former riding of Beauce. The PPC also announced its opposition to further COVID-19 restrictions and lockdown measures, vaccine passports, and compulsory vaccinations as part of its campaign.

The PPC gained around 5 per cent of the popular vote, an improvement on its 2019 result and surpassing the Green Party of Canada in terms of vote share, with some PPC candidates finishing a distant second in the ridings they contested, but the party did not see any candidates elected with Bernier again losing to the Conservatives in Beauce. Following the election, some political scientists and commentators debated whether the PPC's slightly stronger performance contributed to the Conservatives under Erin O'Toole losing to the Liberals. This view was endorsed by Mainstreet Research CEO Quito Maggi and University of Toronto political science professor Nelson Wiseman, who posited that the PPC may have cost the Conservatives at least ten ridings. It has also been described as not a simple generalization, as significant amount of PPC support arose from non-Conservative voters.

After the 2021 federal election 
The PPC organized a rally in Waterloo, Ontario, featuring Bernier and independent MPP Randy Hillier, to support the Freedom Convoy 2022's call to end COVID-19 mandates.

Principles and policies 

Labels used to describe the party include classical liberal, conservative, and both libertarian and populist within the context of right-wing politics; it is generally seen as being on the right-wing to far-right of the left–right political spectrum. Political scientist Brian Budd has described the party in the mould of other global right-wing populist parties, and stated that the economic liberal (economic libertarian in American English) party's platform and Maxime Bernier's rhetoric is blended with radical-right populism, which is "defined by a commitment to xenophobia."; for Budd, it is "aimed at Canada's far right groups and supporters", and "it appears that subscribers to far right ideas and beliefs may be viewing Bernier and the People's Party of Canada as a viable pathway to mainstreaming their xenophobic and nationalistic beliefs in Canada."

Bernier stated that his party is "a coalition of people who are disenchanted with traditional politicians who say one thing one day, and another the next". He mentioned that his platform would be based around the principles of freedom, responsibility, fairness, and respect. Bernier has stated that these principles are non-negotiable, but that members would have input on policies as they are refined, and that a candidate questionnaire asks potential candidates about which policies they want in the platform. In addition to these principles, the party would advocate for "smart populism", which Bernier defines as "populism without emotions", speaking for "all Canadians", and not appeasing "special interest groups". Bernier has described the party as a "grassroots party". He has also stated that the party is neither left wing or right wing, preferring the difference between being free and not free. Bernier told Vassy Kapelos that the party would debate discussions that "the leadership and the caucus" did not want to have while he was a Conservative Party member, also stating that people who espouse antisemitic, racist, or xenophobic positions "are not welcome" in the party. A spokesperson has stated that the party does not debate the science of climate change.

At the time of its formation, the party indicated that its formal platform would be gradually unveiled, but it would generally follow the platform that Bernier ran on during his 2017 Conservative leadership campaign. Bernier stated that the platform "will be built on facts". He said that socially conservative policies such as abortion and gender identity would not be part of the party platform. The party supports removing trade barriers between Canada's provinces.

Economy 
Prominent platform planks include ending corporate welfare and phasing out supply management over a number of years to allow farmers to adapt through compensation yet "save Canadians billions of dollars annually" through lower prices. Following the launch of the party, Bernier stated in a TV interview with BNN Bloomberg that the telecom industry deregulation, increasing airline competition, reducing tax brackets and having a discussion about the privatization of Canada Post, which were key components of his original 2017 Conservative leadership platform, are all areas that he has an interest in.

Environment 
The party's platform states that "it is an undisputed fact that the world's climate has always changed and will continue to change" but rejects the scientific consensus on climate change, which it calls "climate change alarmism". The party plans to withdraw from the global warming fight, withdraw from the Paris Climate Accord, abolish subsidies for green technology, expand the oil and gas industries, scrap "the Liberal government's carbon tax", but allow the private sector and the provinces to address climate issues, and "invest [in] mitigation strategies" if negative effects result from climate change. The party's main focus would be on "implementing practical solutions to make Canada's air, water and soil cleaner".

Foreign affairs 
The party platform says that foreign policies should be "focused on the security and prosperity of Canadians, not an ideological approach that compromises our interests". It supports multilateralism, non-interventionism, free trade, and humanitarianism; however, it plans to not get involved in foreign conflicts, "unless we have a compelling strategic interest in doing so", to reduce Canada's United Nations (UN) presence "to a minimum", withdraw from UN commitments the party sees as threatening "our sovereignty", to accept free trade agreements that protect Canada's economy "from the threat of potentially hostile foreign investors", and phase out development aid. The party opposed Canadian military support for Ukraine during the Russo-Ukrainian War and criticised NATO expansion in Eastern Europe.

Health care 
The party's platform states "it is up to the provinces to implement reforms in line with the more efficient and less costly mixed universal systems of other developed countries. Throwing more federal money at the problem is not the right approach." They plan to replace the Canada Health Transfer with a "transfer of tax points of equivalent value to the provinces and territories" by giving up the goods and services tax (GST) revenue collected by the federal government while creating a temporary program "to compensate poorer provinces" disadvantaged by the replacement. The party claims this would create the conditions for provincial and territorial governments to innovate, while maintaining the Canada Health Act. The party has shown vaccine hesitancy. Bernier and the PPC are opposed to vaccination mandates and support the lifting of pandemic restrictions.

Immigration 
The party plans immigration reform, such as limiting immigration to no more than 150,000 people per year, by removing the parents and grandparents class from the family reunification program, focusing on economic immigration through the reform of the immigration point system, making temporary foreign workers noncompetitive with "Canadian workers", and banning birth tourism. They intend that all immigrants would undergo in-person interviews with immigration officials to determine whether their values and ideas accord with Canadian "societal norms". The party would declare the entire border a port of entry to make deportation easier, since new arrivals can be refused at ports of entry. They would build border fences at popular ports of entry crossings for migrants, rely on private sponsorship instead of government support for funding new refugees, but prioritize those "belonging to persecuted groups barred from neighbouring countries" and sexual minorities.

Multiculturalism 

The party platform advocates for the cultural integration of immigrants, stating that it "enriches" Canadian society; in particular, the party criticized that the government "has pursued a policy of official multiculturalism that encourages immigrants to keep the values and culture they left behind instead of integrating into Canadian society and adopting Canadian values and culture." Some of the examples that they have listed as "distinct values of a contemporary Western civilization" are "equality between men and women", "separation of state and religion", "toleration and pluralism". The party classified Prime Minister Justin Trudeau's comments referring to Canada as "the first post-national state, with no core identity" as a "cult of diversity". It opposes the Canadian Multiculturalism Act, remarking that Canada's government should not help immigrants preserve their cultural heritage. The party intends to "repeal the Multiculturalism Act and eliminate all funding to promote multiculturalism."

Veterans 
On the topic of veterans, the party platform says that "The government of Canada has an obligation to honour the nation's sacred commitment to our military men and women and make sure our veterans receive the support they deserve." It also plans to "enshrine in legislation the country's obligations to our veterans in a Military Covenant", reinstate fair military disability pensions and reemphasize the legislative guarantee of the "benefit of doubt" standard in the Pension Act, review the New Veterans Charter to determine which policies and programs should be retained, simplify the system, and make it easier to navigate.

Electoral results

See also 

 Canadian Alliance
 Populism in Canada
 Reform Party of Canada

References

External links 
 

2018 establishments in Quebec
Anti-immigration politics in Canada
Classical liberal parties
Climate change denial
Conservative parties in Canada
Far-right politics in Canada
Federal political parties in Canada
Libertarianism in Canada
Organizations based in Gatineau
People's Party of Canada
Political parties established in 2018
Political schisms
Right-wing populism in Canada
Right-wing populist parties